Shane Bowers (born July 30, 1999) is a Canadian professional ice hockey forward currently playing for the Providence Bruins of the American Hockey League (AHL) as a prospect to the Boston Bruins of the National Hockey League (NHL). Bowers was drafted in the first round, 28th overall, of the 2017 NHL Entry Draft by the Ottawa Senators.

Playing career

Amateur
Bowers, a Herring Cove native, first played in Halifax, Nova Scotia as a standout at the Bantam level for the Bubba Ray's Gulls before playing in the Nova Scotia Major Midget Hockey League with the Halifax McDonald's.

In the 2014–15 season, Bowers was selected as the NSMMHL's MVP, registering most goals and points in both the regular and post-season. Bowers twice turned down opportunities to play in the Canadian Hockey League (CHL) for a major junior ice hockey team in his native Canada after he was selected in consecutive Quebec Major Junior Hockey League Entry Drafts by the Cape Breton Screaming Eagles and Saint John Sea Dogs. He opted to instead play in the United States, after he was selected 38th overall by the Waterloo Black Hawks in the 2015 United States Hockey League Futures Draft.

Joining the Black Hawks for the 2015–16 season, Bowers showed his two-way potential in contributing with 15 goals and 33 points, leading all in 56 games, leading all Waterloo rookies to earn a selection to the All-Rookie Second Team.  In returning for his second season with Waterloo in 2016–17, Bowers announced his intention on pursuing a collegiate career, committing to Boston University of the Hockey East.  In playing on the Black Hawks' top line, Bowers improved his season totals finishing 10th in the league scoring in producing 22 goals, 29 assists for 51 points in 60 games. He earned the USHL Third All-Star Team honors, however Waterloo was unable to advance past the Western Conference finals in a 3-2 series defeat against the Sioux City Musketeers.

Approaching the 2017 NHL Entry Draft, Bowers was the 16th-ranked North American skater by the NHL Central Scouting Bureau before being selected 28th overall in the first round by the Ottawa Senators. In joining the Boston Terriers as a freshman for the 2017–18 season, Bowers made his collegiate debut, scoring a goal against Union College on September 30, 2017. He scored in his first three NCAA games, including his first multi-goal game against Minnesota State University on October 14, 2017.

On November 5, 2017, Bowers' NHL rights were included by the Senators in a blockbuster three-way deal, heading to Colorado Avalanche in exchange for Matt Duchene. In continuing with the Terriers, Bowers appeared in all 40 games and finished third on the team with 32 points and second in goals with 17. Bowers had a team-best plus-16 rating and on March 14, 2018, Bowers and teammate Brady Tkachuk were selected to the Hockey East Rookie Team. Bowers also received an honourable mention for the Hockey East all-star squads, but was not selected for those teams.

In the 2018–19 season, Bowers returned for his sophomore season with the Terriers. Under the reign of new head coach Albie O'Connell, Boston struggled to replicate their previous seasons success, failing to qualify for the NCAA Tournament. Bowers playing in a second-line role finished third on the team with 11 goals and fourth in scoring with 21 points in 37 games.

Professional
After two seasons with Boston University, Bowers opted to conclude his collegiate career, turning pro in signing a three-year, entry-level contract with the Colorado Avalanche on March 29, 2019. He was immediately signed by the Avalanche's AHL affiliate, the Colorado Eagles, on an amateur try-out contract in their bid for a playoff berth.

During the  season, Bowers made his NHL debut with the Avalanche on November 10, 2022, against the Nashville Predators, however he suffered an injury and had to leave the game after less than two minutes of ice time. On December 14, 2022, in returning from injury he was re-assigned to continue with the Colorado Eagles. Bowers added 14 points through 37 games with the Eagles before he was traded by the Avalanche to the Boston Bruins in exchange for Keith Kinkaid on February 25, 2023.

International play
Bowers made his International debut, captaining Canada Black at the 2015 World U-17 Hockey Challenge before playing at the 2016 Ivan Hlinka Memorial Tournament, scoring 1 goal in 4 appearances for Canada.

During his sophomore season with the Terriers, Bowers was selected to participate for Canada at the 2019 World Junior Championships, in Vancouver, British Columbia. Chosen for his responsible two-way game, Bowers played as center on the third line registering 2 assists in 5 games before suffering a shock elimination in a 2-1 overtime defeat to Finland at the Quarterfinals on January 2, 2019 to place 6th.

Career statistics

Regular season and playoffs

International

Awards and honours

References

External links

1999 births
Living people
Boston University Terriers men's ice hockey players
Canadian ice hockey centres
Colorado Avalanche players
Colorado Eagles players
Ice hockey people from Nova Scotia
National Hockey League first-round draft picks
Ottawa Senators draft picks
Providence Bruins players
Sportspeople from Halifax, Nova Scotia
Waterloo Black Hawks players